The ideology of the military junta that ruled Greece from 1967 to 1974 was followed by the creation and/or use of special terms that were employed by the junta as propaganda tools and to transmit its message to the Greek people as well as influence their way of thinking and attack the anti-junta movement. The terms of the lexicon include unique expressions and institutions that provide a glimpse into junta's mindset and government structure. Other words and concepts were borrowed and appropriated. Yet other terms were already in use prior to the 1967 coup. Finally, some are taken from Greece's cultural tradition. Some examples of these terms as well as their contextual meaning follow.

Sometimes the terms were combined for stronger effect. As an example O Skotadismos kai i Synodiporia meaning Western and Greek leftist sympathisers, in other words internal and external opposition to the junta.

The junta always communicated in katharevousa Greek with only one exception, Rahokokalia tou laou, which was specially coined for farmer consumption and it is the only phrase in the junta vocabulary to be in demotic Greek.

See also
 Lingua Tertii Imperii
 Newspeak

Citations and notes

Modern Greek words and phrases
Greek junta
Greek military junta
Wikipedia glossaries using tables